Confederation of African Tennis (CAT) is the continental governing body of tennis in Africa. It is the non-profit private organization based in Tunis and affiliated with International Tennis Federation. The main aim of the CAT is to regulate the rules of tennis in the African continent, to develop the fundamental infrastructures for the sport, and to popularize it throughout the continent. For this, CAT also recognizes the excellence of professionals in the field of tennis, including players and member associations with awards and accolades. It is the largest regional body of the tennis with 50 member countries. English and French are the official languages of the organization. 
According to CAT, African continent is divided into five different zones on the geographical basis with each zone has its own zonal head.

Affiliated Members

CAT is the largest regional recognizing body of the tennis with 52 members. This is the list of all the members of CAT, recognized by it as the representative of their respective country.

References

 
Tennis organizations
Sports governing bodies in Africa
Tennis in Africa